Sphegina punctata is a species of hoverfly in the family Syrphidae.

Distribution
Canada, United States.

References

Eristalinae
Insects described in 1921
Diptera of North America